Southeast Arcadia is a census-designated place (CDP) in DeSoto County, Florida, United States. The population was 6,554 at the 2010 census.

Geography
Southeast Arcadia is located at  (27.198854, -81.851908).

According to the United States Census Bureau, the CDP has a total area of 7.3 square miles (18.9 km), all land.

Demographics

As of the census of 2000, there were 6,064 people, 1,897 households, and 1,295 families residing in the CDP. The racial makeup of the CDP was 73.24% White, 4.16% African American, 2.49% Native American, 0.36% Asian, 18.09% from other races, and 1.67% from two or more races. Hispanic or Latino of any race were 45.73% of the population.

There were 1,897 households, out of which 30.4% had children under the age of 18 living with them, 49.1% were married couples living together, 10.8% had a female householder with no husband present, and 31.7% were non-families. 19.5% of all households were made up of individuals, and 10.8% had someone living alone who was 65 years of age or older.  The average household size was 3.16 and the average family size was 3.37.

In the CDP, the population was spread out, with 25.3% under the age of 18, 15.4% from 18 to 24, 28.3% from 25 to 44, 17.7% from 45 to 64, and 13.4% who were 65 years of age or older.  The median age was 30 years. For every 100 females, there were 139.1 males.  For every 100 females age 18 and over, there were 150.5 males.

The median income for a household in the CDP was $28,409, and the median income for a family was $30,053. Males had a median income of $20,593 versus $16,904 for females. The per capita income for the CDP was $13,891.  About 20.3% of families and 33.8% of the population were below the poverty line, including 43.7% of those under age 18 and 4.7% of those age 65 or over.

In 2010 Southeast Arcadia had a population of 6,554.  The racial and ethnic composition of the population was 52.3% Mexican, 4.5% other Hispanic, 37.2% non-Hispanic white, 4.9% black or African American, 0.6% Native American, 0.1% Asian Indian, 0.2% other Asian, 0.2% non-Hispanic reporting some other race and 3.4% from two or more races.

References

Census-designated places in DeSoto County, Florida
Census-designated places in Florida